Ophiomyia is genus of Diptera (fly) in the family Agromyzidae.

In West Africa, the larvae of various species, such as Ophiomyia spencerella, Ophiomyia phaseola, and Ophiomyia centrosematis, are pests of cultivated bean crops.

Species
Some species of this genus are:
 Ophiomyia abutilivora
 Ophiomyia ambrosia
 Ophiomyia apta
 Ophiomyia arizonensis
 Ophiomyia asterovora
 Ophiomyia asymmetrica
 Ophiomyia atriplicis
 Ophiomyia banffensis
 Ophiomyia bernardinensis
 Ophiomyia boulderensis
 Ophiomyia camarae (Spencer)
 Ophiomyia carolinae
 Ophiomyia carolinensis
 Ophiomyia chondrillae
 Ophiomyia commendata
 Ophiomyia congregata
 Ophiomyia coniceps
 Ophiomyia cornuta
 Ophiomyia debilis
 Ophiomyia delecta
 Ophiomyia devia
 Ophiomyia duodecima
 Ophiomyia eldorensis
 Ophiomyia fastella
 Ophiomyia fastosa
 Ophiomyia fida
 Ophiomyia frosti
 Ophiomyia gentilis
 Ophiomyia haydeni
 Ophiomyia jacintensis
 Ophiomyia kingsmerensis
 Ophiomyia labiatarum
 Ophiomyia lacertosa
 Ophiomyia lantanae (Froggatt)
 Ophiomyia lassa
 Ophiomyia lauta
 Ophiomyia levata
 Ophiomyia lippiae
 Ophiomyia maculata
 Ophiomyia major
 Ophiomyia malitiosa
 Ophiomyia maura
 Ophiomyia melica
 Ophiomyia monticola
 Ophiomyia nasuta
 Ophiomyia nealaea
 Ophiomyia nona
 Ophiomyia obstipa
 Ophiomyia octava
 Ophiomyia parva
 Ophiomyia parvella
 Ophiomyia phaseoli (Tryon, 1895)
 Ophiomyia praecisa
 Ophiomyia pinguis (Fallen) 
 Ophiomyia prima
 Ophiomyia proboscidea
 Ophiomyia pulicaria
 Ophiomyia quarta
 Ophiomyia quinta
 Ophiomyia rhodesiensis (Spencer)
 Ophiomyia secunda
 Ophiomyia septima
 Ophiomyia sexta
 Ophiomyia shastensis
 Ophiomyia similata
 Ophiomyia simplex
 Ophiomyia stricklandi
 Ophiomyia subdefinita
 Ophiomyia subpraecisa
 Ophiomyia tertia
 Ophiomyia texana
 Ophiomyia texella
 Ophiomyia tiliae
 Ophiomyia undecima
 Ophiomyia vibrissata
 Ophiomyia virginiensis
 Ophiomyia vockerothi
 Ophiomyia wabamunensis
 Ophiomyia yolensis

References 

Brazhnikov V. C., Zur Biologie und Systematik einiger Arten minierender Dipteren, Izv. mosk. sel'. -khoz. Inst. 3:19-43. (1897)

Opomyzoidea genera
Agromyzidae